Banner Peak is the second tallest peak in the Ritter Range of California's Sierra Nevada. It lies within the boundaries of the Ansel Adams Wilderness; at the foot of the peak lie Garnet Lake, Lake Ediza, and the famous Thousand Island Lake. Other nearby lakes include Lake Catherine and Shadow Lake.

The peak was named in 1883 by USGS topographer Willard D. Johnson who observed a banner cloud streaming from the summit.

Climate

According to the Köppen climate classification system, Banner Peak is located in an alpine climate zone. Most weather fronts originate in the Pacific Ocean, and travel east toward the Sierra Nevada mountains. As fronts approach, they are forced upward by the peaks (orographic lift), causing them to drop their moisture in the form of rain or snowfall onto the range.

References

External links
 Weather forecast: Banner Peak

Mountains of the Ansel Adams Wilderness
Mountains of Madera County, California
North American 3000 m summits
Mountains of Northern California
Mountains of the Sierra Nevada (United States)
Inyo National Forest
Sierra National Forest